The 1978 season was the 66th season of competitive soccer in the United States.

National teams

Men

Senior

Women

Managerial changes

League standings

North American Soccer League (Div. 1)

National Conference 

Eastern Division

American Conference

NASL Playoffs

American Soccer League (Div. 2)

College soccer

National Challenge Cup

Final

American clubs in international competition

References 
 The Year in American Soccer - 1978

 
Seasons in American soccer